Chaleh Qara (also Romanized as Chāleh Qarā; also known as Chāleh Qarah and Chāl Qareh) is a village in Khorram Dasht Rural District, in the Central District of Kashan County, Isfahan Province, Iran. At the 2006 census, its population was 44, in 22 families.

References 

Populated places in Kashan County